William Langham (1876–1927) was an English-born footballer who played as an outside right in the Football League around the turn of the 19th century.

He played for Notts County in the late 1890s scoring 15 times in 47 appearances for them before playing for Bristol City and Leicester Fosse. He joined Doncaster Rovers for their first season in the Football League scoring 16 goals in the 65 League and Cup games he played for them over two seasons. After they failed re-election in 1905, he was sold to Gainsborough Trinity.

Langham returned to Rovers for the 1906−07 season scoring 9 goals including 4 in a 7−1 win against Grantham Avenue. He was sold to Lincoln City in March 1907 for a fee of £75, and appeared in a total of 58 Football League games for them, scoring 21 times.

References

External links
 Profile at Foxes History

1876 births
1927 deaths
Footballers from Nottingham
Association football outside forwards
English Football League players
Blackpool F.C. players
Notts County F.C. players
Bristol City F.C. players
Leicester City F.C. players
Doncaster Rovers F.C. players
Gainsborough Trinity F.C. players
Lincoln City F.C. players
Midland Football League players
English footballers
People from Lenton, Nottingham
Footballers from Nottinghamshire